The Hitcher is a 1986 American road horror-thriller film directed by Robert Harmon and written by Eric Red. It stars Rutger Hauer as the title character, a murderous hitchhiker who stalks a young motorist (C. Thomas Howell) across the highways of West Texas. Jeffrey DeMunn and Jennifer Jason Leigh appear in supporting roles.

Released in the United States on February 21, 1986, the film was initially met with tepid critical and commercial response, grossing $5.8 million on a $7.9 million budget. Opinion of The Hitcher improved in later years, however, with Hauer's performance receiving praise. The film was followed by a 2003 sequel, which featured Howell reprising his role, and a 2007 remake.

Plot
Jim Halsey, a young man delivering a car from Chicago to San Diego, spots a man hitchhiking in the West Texas desert and gives him a ride. The brooding and evasive hitcher, who calls himself John Ryder, forces Jim's leg down on the accelerator when they pass a stranded car. Ryder states he murdered the driver and intends to do the same to Jim, threatening him with a switchblade. Terrified, Jim asks what Ryder wants. He replies, "I want you to stop me." When Jim realizes that Ryder's seat belt is unbuckled and the passenger door is ajar, he shoves Ryder out of the moving car.

Relieved, Jim continues his journey. When he sees Ryder in the back of a family car, Jim tries to warn the occupants, but has a minor accident. He later comes across the family's blood-soaked car and vomits after peeking inside. Ryder then corners Jim but simply tosses him the keys from Jim's car. Ryder leaves with a trucker, and later nearly runs Jim down with the truck as it crashes into the pumps of a gas station. As Jim flees, Ryder causes the station to explode.

At a roadside diner, Jim meets Nash, a waitress who cooks him lunch while he calls the police. He starts eating until he finds a severed finger among his French fries, indicating Ryder's proximity. The police arrive immediately but they arrest Jim, whom Ryder is now framing for his murders. During interrogation, Sergeant Starr infers Jim's innocence. However, he instructs his two deputies to lock Jim up overnight as protocol, until other law enforcement arrives from Austin for further questioning. Jim wakes to find the cell door unlocked and the three officers murdered. He panics and flees with a revolver. At a gas station, he sees two officers, takes them hostage, and speaks on the radio to Captain Esteridge, the officer in charge of the manhunt. As Esteridge convinces Jim to surrender, Ryder shows up and kills the two officers.

The patrol car crashes, and Ryder disappears again. After briefly considering suicide, Jim reaches a cafe, where Ryder confronts him. He points out Jim's revolver is unloaded, and proves it by challenging Jim to shoot him. Ryder also remains oblique about his reasons for tormenting him, and after cryptically placing two coins on Jim's eyes, leaves him several bullets and departs. Jim boards a bus, where he meets Nash and explains his situation. After a police car pulls the bus over, Jim surrenders. The furious officers accuse him of killing their colleagues and attempt to kill him. Nash appears with Jim's revolver, disarms the officers, and flees with Jim in their patrol car. As the police chase after them, Ryder joins the chase and murders the officers by causing a massive car accident and shooting down a police helicopter.

Jim and Nash abandon the patrol car and hike to a motel. While Jim is in the shower, Ryder abducts Nash and Jim immediately searches for her. Captain Esteridge discovers Jim and enlists him to try to negotiate with Ryder, who is at the wheel of a large Mack truck. Ryder has gagged and tied Nash between the truck and its trailer hitch, and is threatening to tear her apart. Esteridge tells Jim that his men cannot shoot Ryder because his foot would slip off the clutch, causing the truck to roll. Jim enters the cab with Ryder, who gives him a revolver and tells him to shoot, but Jim is unable to do so. Ryder, disappointed, releases the clutch, killing Nash.

Ryder is taken into custody. Esteridge gives Jim a ride, but Jim, believing the police cannot hold Ryder, takes Esteridge's revolver and vehicle to chase down Ryder's prison bus. Ryder kills the deputies and leaps through Jim's windshield as the bus crashes. Jim slams on his brakes, sending Ryder through the windshield and onto the road. Ryder challenges Jim to run him over, which he does. When Jim leaves his car to look at Ryder's body, Ryder jumps up, but Jim shoots him repeatedly with a shotgun, finally killing him. Jim leans against Esteridge's car in a daze, and smokes a cigarette as the sun sets.

Cast

Production

Development
When writer Eric Red was 20 years old, he made a short film entitled Gunman's Blues in the hopes of getting the opportunity to direct a feature-length film. When no offers came, he moved from New York City to Austin, Texas, taking a drive-away car cross-country. While driving from one city to another, he got the idea for a film from The Doors song "Riders on the Storm". He found that the "elements of the song – a killer on the road in a storm plus the cinematic feel of the music – would make a terrific opening for a film". Red had a lot of time to think about the song and it inspired ideas for the story. During his seven-month stay in Austin, he drove a taxi cab and wrote The Hitcher. In 1983, he sent a letter to several Hollywood producers asking if he could send them a copy of the screenplay for The Hitcher. His letter concluded: "It (the story) grabs you by the guts and does not let up and it does not let go. When you read it, you will not sleep for a week. When the movie is made, the country will not sleep for a week". Script development executive David Bombyk received a copy of Red's letter and was intrigued by the description of the film. Red sent him a script that was approximately 190 pages in length (one page traditionally equals one minute of screen time).

Screenplay
In the original script, an entire family is slaughtered in their station wagon, an eyeball is discovered inside of a hamburger, a woman is tied to a truck and a pole and then torn in half, two teenagers engage in sex, shootings and car crashes. In its original form, Bombyk found the script to be "extremely brutal and extremely gory", but he and personal manager Kip Ohman (who later became co-producers of the film) also saw in it "a level of challenge, intensity and poetry". Bombyk and Ohman were worried about getting it into good enough shape to show their boss, producer Ed Feldman, and his partner, Charles Meeker, and prove to them that it was more than an exploitation film. Bombyk worked with Red via several long-distance phone calls to Texas and eventually the writer moved to Los Angeles. Red agreed to work with Ohman on the script until it was ready to be shown to Feldman and Meeker. They liked the script but wondered, "how could we manage to translate it to the screen without making a slasher movie?" Meeker said.

Feldman and Meeker decided to come on board as executive producers. Ohman and Red spent six months reworking the script, removing most of what Ohman felt was repetitive violence. Once they got it in good enough shape, Ohman gave it back to Bombyk and also to David Madden, a production executive for 20th Century Fox. Within a few days, Madden called back and told them the script was "terrific". The studio was not comfortable with the subject matter but felt that the writing was unique and interesting enough to give the filmmakers a letter-of-intent to distribute the film. This would allow them to get financing and then, once filming was completed, the studio would reimburse them for the budget.

Casting
The film's producers then went looking for an inexpensive director. Still photographer-turned-cameraman Robert Harmon was given a copy of the script by his agent and called his agent early next morning, telling him that he wanted to do it. In February 1984, Harmon met the producers to talk about the script. He recalled that "even the exact actions that remained in the script were described in much bloodier and gorier detail". The producers were impressed with him and the fact that he also envisioned the film as a Hitchcockian thriller. However, Harmon objected to the eyeball in the hamburger scene and never planned to show the girl getting ripped in half.

In early drafts of the script, John Ryder had been described as skeletal in nature and so actors like David Bowie, Sting, Sam Shepard, Harry Dean Stanton, and Terence Stamp were mentioned. Harmon was set on casting Stamp and even carried around his picture to pitch meetings. Stamp received a copy of the script but turned down the role. Sam Elliott was offered the role but an agreement could not be reached on his salary. Michael Ironside was also considered for the role. Singer mentioned Dutch actor Rutger Hauer. While in L.A. for a short visit, Hauer read the script. Even though he was looking for non-villainous roles, the script "really got a hold of me ... I thought, 'If I do one more villain, I should do this'. I couldn't refuse it". The one reservation Hauer had was with the scene where the girl is torn apart and Feldman told him, "you are the bad guy and you'll be the baddest bad guy there ever was!" Red mentioned to Hauer that he had Rolling Stones guitarist Keith Richards in mind when he wrote the part of Ryder. Furthermore, Red felt that the character should have an electronic voice box.

For the role of Jim Halsey, the producers mentioned Matthew Modine, Tom Cruise, and Emilio Estevez. They agreed on C. Thomas Howell and liked his look. At the time, Howell was being more selective with the roles he took and heard that the script was a generic thriller. Harmon personally gave Howell a copy of the script. He could not put it down and "couldn't believe the things that happened to my character in the first 12 pages. I knew I wanted to do it". He also wanted to work with Hauer. Unbeknownst to Hauer, Howell found him "frightening, intimidating, and that he was in a constant state of fear, almost as if he really was John Ryder and I really was Jim Halsey".

Jennifer Jason Leigh agreed to do the film because she wanted to work with Hauer again (they co-starred in Flesh + Blood), and loved the character of Nash because "there was a real person there".

In addition, veteran character actors Billy Green Bush (known for playing ill-fated police officers in Electra Glide in Blue and Jason Goes to Hell: The Final Friday), Gene Davis (known for playing the naked psychopathic killer Warren Stacy in 10 to Midnight), Armin Shimerman (who would later be the voice of General Skarr in The Grim Adventures of Billy and Mandy), and Emmy-winner Henry Darrow, have supporting roles as police officers who pursue Jim Halsey.

Pre-production
Fox ultimately rejected the project over the budget and saw it as a "straight-out horror movie". Madden also admitted that he would have "argued to soften the movie. There were some people at the studio who thought it was pretty gross". Feldman and Meeker optioned the film themselves, paying Red $25,000. Major studios like Universal Pictures and Warner Bros. passed on it, as did smaller ones like Orion Pictures and New World Pictures. Many executives liked the script but balked at the girl being ripped apart scene. At least two studios were willing to consider making it but only if Harmon was replaced. However, the film's producers had faith in their director and stuck by Harmon.

Independent producer Donna Dubrow heard about The Hitcher while working on another film and to her it sounded like "Duel with a person". When she went to work for Silver Screen Partners/Home Box Office, she contacted Feldman, a former employer, and asked for a copy of the script. She submitted it to her boss, HBO senior vice-president Maurice Singer. He liked it and sent it back to New York to be read by Michael Fuchs, HBO chairman and chief operating officer. They needed Fuchs' approval to get the film made. It would not be easy to convince him because it was not the kind of material that he liked and he did not want to make it. However, Dubrow had to go back to New York on other business and met with Fuchs. She mentioned The Hitcher script and pitched the Hitchcockian thriller angle. When she returned to L.A., Singer told her that Fuchs agreed to make the film but with the stipulation that the girl would not be torn apart and the violence would be reduced. The film's budget was set at $5.8 million.

Over the next few months, the filmmakers negotiated two key scenes in the script: the girl getting ripped apart and the eyeball in the hamburger. For the latter scene, Harmon just changed the body part to a finger. As for the former, everyone at HBO/Silver Screen, except Dubrow, wanted it changed. Fuchs did not want the girl to die and Dubrow argued that this would change the story significantly. There were arguments about how the girl should die and Dubrow remembers, "they were trying to make her death not horrible, when – by the nature of the script – it had to be". The studio even suggested softening her death by having a funeral. The filmmakers refused to back down and Silver Screen executives finally relented at the last minute.

Release

In theaters
Contractually, TriStar Pictures was obligated to distribute any film by HBO/Silver Screen. TriStar representatives saw an early screening and studio president David Matalon said, "It's the best film that we have for 1986". The Hitcher opened in 800 theaters on February 21, 1986, and made $2.1 million during its opening weekend, going on to gross $5.8 million in North America.

Critical response
On the review aggregator website Rotten Tomatoes, The Hitcher holds a 62% approval rating based on 37 critic reviews, with an average rating of 6/10. The consensus reads: "Its journey is never quite as revelatory as it could be, but The Hitcher stands as a white-knuckle vision of horror, bolstered by Rutger Hauer's menacing performance". On Metacritic, the film has a weighted average score of 32 out of 100, based on 13 critics, indicating "generally unfavorable reviews".

Roger Ebert awarded it no stars, arguing that the identification of the film's hero with the killer is hollow because the killer has no backstory or even a motive. Gene Siskel also gave the film zero stars, calling it "a nauseating thriller" and "a thinly veiled but more gruesome ripoff of Steven Spielberg's Duel". In her review for The New York Times, Janet Maslin criticized the film's lack of intensity and originality, and wrote, "Mr. Harmon, making his feature debut, displays a much surer hand for action than for character, though even some of the action footage here looks meaninglessly overblown". Variety called it "a highly unimaginative slasher ... with a script that has many holes". In his review for The Washington Post, Paul Attanasio wrote: "The script (by Eric Red) is laconic in a dull way, much Cain but hardly able. And Harmon and his cinematographer, John Seale, have shot the movie in such brown murk, you can hardly make anything out. By the end, you're willing to forgive Ryder his worst if someone would just change the light bulb". In his review for The Globe and Mail, Jay Scott described the film as a "slasher movie about gay panic, a nasty piece of homophobic angst for the age of AIDS". A rare positive review came from Newsweek magazine's Jack Kroll who called it, "an odyssey of horror and suspense that's as tightly wound as a garrote and as beautifully designed as a guillotine". Leonard Maltin awarded the film a score of 2 1/2 out of 4 stars (his most frequently used rating), criticizing the film's violence as being "genuinely grisly and unappealing" while also noting that the film wasn't without interest.

While most reviewers criticized the sadistic nature of the film's violence in general and Nash's death in particular, one of the film's producers said that the film's commercial failure was because of a lack of violence and that Nash's death should have been shown: "There's other gore in the movie, other killings, but this is the main one. It's the motivation for the hero. You can't show all the killings we showed and then not show the main one. It's cheating the audience". Hauer said critics misunderstood the film. According to him, it is an allegory in which Ryder represents evil. However, Ebert wrote that "I could see that the film was meant as an allegory, not a documentary. But on its own terms, this movie is diseased and corrupt. I would have admired it more if it had found the courage to acknowledge the real relationship it was portraying between Howell and Rutger, but no: It prefers to disguise itself as a violent thriller, and on that level it is reprehensible".

Home video
The Hitcher has been released on VHS, laserdisc and DVD. Its first DVD release had just the trailer as a special feature, then in 2003, Europe received a two-disc special edition DVD set, which was digitally remastered from the original negative. It also contained a bonus disc with special features that are not found anywhere else and a booklet, containing photos and a mini-essay on the film itself.

The first high-definition release occurred in Germany, 2019, when a Blu-ray and DVD Mediabook set was released by Alive Fernsehjuwelen GmbH. Although appearing in 1080p high definition for the first time, this release is transferred and remastered from 35mm film and therefore this edition suffers from texture loss, warm tint filters and regular white-outs.

British label Second Sight Films are scheduled to release The Hitcher on remastered 4K Blu-ray in 2023 as the original camera negative film elements had been found.

Legacy

The film spawned a sequel, The Hitcher II: I've Been Waiting, in 2003, with Howell reprising his role as Jim Halsey.

A remake using the original title, produced by Michael Bay and directed by Dave Meyers, was released on January 19, 2007, starring Sean Bean as John Ryder, Zachary Knighton as Jim Halsey, and Neal McDonough as Esteridge. The remake added a female protagonist named Grace Andrews, who was portrayed by Sophia Bush.

References

External links 
 
 
 
 The Hitcher at the TCM Movie Database
 
 
 

1986 films
1980s chase films
1980s crime thriller films
1980s psychological thriller films
1980s road movies
1980s horror thriller films
1986 horror films
American crime thriller films
1986 directorial debut films
Films about automobiles
Films set in California
Films shot in Los Angeles
Films about hitchhiking
American neo-noir films
American road movies
American serial killer films
TriStar Pictures films
Films directed by Robert Harmon
Films scored by Mark Isham
1980s English-language films
1980s American films
Vigilante films